"Brother" is a song by American Christian rock band Needtobreathe. It was released as the fifth single from Rivers in the Wasteland on February 2, 2015. The official single version features Gavin DeGraw and was released to Hot AC radio on May 4, 2015. The song was written by Bear and Bo Rinehart, and produced by Dave Tozer, using elements of Ed Cash's LP version. The song peaked at number 8 on Billboard Hot Rock Songs, number 1 on Billboard Hot Christian Songs, and number 98 on the Billboard Hot 100, becoming the band's first Hot 100 chart entry.

Critical reception
Entertainment Weeklys Madison Vain stated "[Brother] is full, anthemic, a little bit woodsy, and alarmingly catchy." and claimed that "[Bear Rinehart's] sincerity is unmistakable in his vocals, and the bluegrass backing culminates in something sweetly rich." Pailey Martin of Billboard called it a "heartfelt track." BreatheCast's Jeannie Law said it was an "unforgettable collaboration" and that "[Bear Rinehart's] raw vocals, and the bluegrass backing truly make the song a powerful anthem." Jeff Koch of PopMatters called it "cheesy" and said that "[Brother] is practically begging to be used in the background of some Grey’s Anatomy montage."

Track listing

Charts

Weekly charts

Year-end charts

Decade-end charts

Certifications

Release history

References

2014 songs
2015 singles
Gavin DeGraw songs
Needtobreathe songs
Atlantic Records singles